The Mangapapa River is a river of the Bay of Plenty Region of New Zealand's North Island. It rises on the north slopes of the Mamaku Plateau at the southern end of the Kaimai Range and meets the Opuiaki River at the head of Lake McLaren, which discharges to the Wairoa River a short distance downstream from the lake at the confluence with the Mangakarengorengo River.

The river has been modified as part of the Kaimai hydro power scheme. The 15.6 MW Lloyd Mandeno Power Station is on the left bank of the river and discharges water diverted from other nearby streams.

See also
List of rivers of New Zealand

References

 New Zealand 1:50000 Topographic map sheet BD36 - Lower Kaimai

Rivers of the Bay of Plenty Region
Rivers of New Zealand